Route 297 is short 25 km two-lane north/south highway in Quebec, Canada, which starts in Baie-des-Sables at the junction of Route 132 and ends in Saint-Moïse. The highway acts mainly as a shortcut between Baie-des-Sables and the southern section of Route 132 which leads to the Matapédia River Valley and the southern part of the Gaspé Peninsula.

Municipalities along Route 297
Municipalities listed from south to north:
 Saint-Moïse
 Saint-Noël
 Saint-Damase
 Baie-des-Sables

See also
 List of Quebec provincial highways

References

External links 
 Provincial Route Map (Courtesy of the Quebec Ministry of Transportation) 
Route 297 on Google Maps

297